Silver Creek Valley is a valley and neighborhood of the Evergreen district of San Jose, California. Silver Creek Valley is largely an affluent bedroom community.

Geography

The neighborhood is bordered on the east by the Diablo Range foothills. It is separated from the Edenvale and Santa Teresa by the Silver Creek Hills.

The Silver Creek Open Space Preserve makes up a large portion of the Silver Creek Hills.

Education
Silver Creek is served by Silver Creek High School, James Franklin Smith Elementary School, and Silver Oak Elementary School.

Notable residents
Ray McDonald, NFL athlete for the San Francisco 49ers
Robbie Martin, NFL athlete for the Detroit Lions and Indianapolis Colts
Trent Baalke, NFL executive for the Jacksonville Jaguars and San Francisco 49ers
Vernon Davis, NFL athlete for the San Francisco 49ers

References

External links

Neighborhoods in San Jose, California